As of 2022, the Ohio State Buckeyes have the most first-round selections in the history of the NFL draft with 87. They are third behind USC and Notre Dame for overall draft picks with 460 (as of 2020). In the 2015 draft, the defending national champion Buckeyes had no players selected in the first round (no eligible underclassmen declared), the first time a championship team had gone without first round picks since the 2003 draft when the 2002 National Champion Buckeyes did the same. 2004 saw the most Buckeyes selected in a single NFL draft with 14. 1998 is the only year, since the draft's inception in 1936, in which no Buckeye has been selected. The following are the lists of Ohio State players selected in the NFL draft and NFL supplemental drafts since 1936.

Tom Orosz Punter

Notable undrafted players

References

Ohio State

Ohio State Buckeyes NFL draft